Duke of Öland, Duchess of Öland or Duke of Eyland is a Swedish substantive title.

The following rulers have held Öland as duke or duchess:
 Prince Waldemar, Duke of Öland 1310-1318 (also of Finland and Uppland)
 Princess Ingeborg, Duchess of Öland 1312 to about 1357 as consort and widow of Prince Waldemar
 Prince Eric (son of above Waldemar and Ingeborg), Duke of Öland 1318 to about 1328
 Crown Prince Eric, Duke of Öland 1557-1560 (also of Småland), then King Eric XIV of Sweden 
 Crown Prince Carl Gustav, Duke of Öland (according to Queen Christina) 1650-1654, then King Carl X Gustav of Sweden

Öland
Swedish monarchy
Sweden history-related lists
Dukedoms of Sweden
Öland